L'Enterprise was a French schooner wrecked on the Sister Islands in Bass Strait off Tasmania, in 1802 or 1803

Registered in Mauritius, L'Enterprise was a schooner of 90 tons.

Voyage
Her master, Alexander Le Corre, sought permission from Governor King in September 1802 to go sealing in Bass Strait.  He was given permission and departed Port Jackson on 4 October 1802.  The ship was wrecked either late in 1802 or early in 1803 and Corre and all 12 members of his crew drowned.

Salvage
The schooner Endeavour under Joseph Underwood was sent to salvage L'Enterprise but was unsuccessful. L'Enterprise′s rigging and sails were auctioned in Sydney on 15 March 1803.

References

Shipwrecks of Bass Strait
Maritime incidents in 1802
Maritime incidents in 1803
Schooners of Australia
Ships built in France
1790s ships